Falls City High School may refer to:

 Falls City High School (Nebraska), United States; see Falls City, Nebraska#Education
 Falls City High School (Oregon), United States
 Falls City High School (Texas), United States